Brooklyn Technical High School, commonly called Brooklyn Tech and administratively designated High School 430, is an elite public high school in New York City that specializes in science, technology, engineering, and mathematics. It is one of three original specialized high schools operated by the New York City Department of Education, along with Stuyvesant High School and the Bronx High School of Science. Brooklyn Tech is considered one of the country's most prestigious and selective high schools. Brooklyn Tech is ranked #6 in New York City and #46 overall in the United States for college readiness and graduation rates.

Admission to Brooklyn Tech involves taking the Specialized High Schools Admissions Test and scoring the cutoff for Brooklyn Tech. Each November, about 30,000 eighth and ninth graders take the 3-hour test for admittance to eight of the nine specialized high schools. About 1,900 to 1,950 students are admitted each year.

Brooklyn Tech counts top scientists, inventors, innovators, Fortune 500 company CEOs and founders, high-ranking diplomats, academic scholars, literary and media figures, professional athletes, National Medal recipients, Nobel laureates, and Olympic medalists among its alumni.

Overview

Admission
Admission to Brooklyn Tech is based exclusively on the Specialized High Schools Admissions Test (SHSAT), open to all eighth-grade and first-time ninth-grade New York City students. The test has math (word problems and computation) and verbal (reading comprehension and grammar) sections. Of the approximately 30,000 students taking the SHSAT for September 2011 admission, with 23,085 students listing Brooklyn Tech as a choice on their application, about 1,951 offers were made (the most of any of the specialized high schools, partly due to BTHS's size).

Graduation requirements
There have long been "service credit" requirements, dating to at least the 1950s and likely earlier, for a student to receive a Brooklyn Tech diploma. Beginning with the class of 2010, each student must meet the following requirements by the end of their senior year to receive a BTHS diploma:

I. A minimum of 50 hours of community service outside of the school or through specified club activities.

II. A minimum of 32 service credits earned through participation in Tech clubs, teams, and/or participation in designated school related events.

Service credits are earned as follows: 1. 8 service credits per term to all students in Legacy Clubs; Student Government (SGO); Student Productions; and/or PSAL Teams (including Cheerleading),2. 6 service credits per term to all students working on office squads; participating in Student Leadership; who hold membership in a chapter of an honor society; and/or are in clubs that represent Brooklyn Tech in some significant activities,3. 4 service credits per term to all students who participate in all other clubs not referred to above.4. Service Credits numbering less than a maximum of 4 can be given to students who participate in unique, yet insignificant activities as determined by a member of faculty.

Reputation
Brooklyn Tech is one of the most elite, prestigious and selective high schools in the United States. Together with Stuyvesant High School and Bronx High School of Science, it is one of the three original Specialized High Schools of New York City, operated by the New York City Department of Education, all three of which The Washington Post cited in 2006 as among the country's best magnet schools (a category the school is often placed in, though its founding predates the concept of a "magnet school", whose intended purpose was not the same). Admission is by competitive examination. As a public school, BTHS has no tuition fee, but only students who reside in New York City are allowed to attend, as per the Hecht-Calandra Act.

Brooklyn Tech ranked 2nd in New York State on the 2021 U.S. News & World Report "Best High Schools" list, making it the highest ranked Specialized High School. In 2008 Newsweek listed it among five public high schools that were not in the magazine's 13 "Public Elite" ranking, explaining, "Newsweeks Challenge Index is designed to recognize schools that challenge average students, and not magnet or charter schools that draw only the best students in their areas. These [...] were excluded from the list of top high schools because [...] their sky-high SAT and ACT scores indicate they have few or no average students". Brooklyn Technical High School consistently appears in the U.S. News and World Reports list of the top 50 High Schools in the United States.

Brooklyn Tech is a founding member of the National Consortium for Specialized Secondary Schools of Mathematics, Science and Technology. Routinely, 99% of its graduates are accepted to four-year colleges with the 2020 graduating class being offered more than $150 million in scholarships and grants. In 2011, U.S. News & World Report ranked Brooklyn Tech among the nation's 50 best high schools for mathematics and science. It was ranked #2 on Niche's "Standout High Schools in America" list.

History
In 1918, Dr. Albert L. Colston, chair of the Math Department at Manual Training High School, recommended establishing a technical high school for Brooklyn boys. His plan envisioned a heavy concentration of math, science, and drafting courses with parallel paths leading either to college or to a technical career in industry. By 1922, Dr. Colston's concept was approved by the Board of Education, and Brooklyn Technical High School opened in a converted warehouse at 49 Flatbush Avenue Extension, with 2,400 students. This location, in the shadow of the Manhattan Bridge, is the reason the school seal bears that bridge's image, rather than the more obvious symbol for the borough, the Brooklyn Bridge. Brooklyn Tech would occupy one more location before settling into its site at 29 Fort Greene Place, for which the groundbreaking was held in 1930.

Early years
Atypical for American high schools, Brooklyn Tech uses a system of college-style majors.  The curriculum consists of two years of general studies with a technical and engineering emphasis, followed by two years of a student-chosen major.

The curriculum remained largely unchanged until the end of Dr. Colston's 20-year term as principal in 1942. Upon his retirement, Tech was led briefly by acting principal Ralph Breiling, who was succeeded by Principal Harold Taylor in 1944. Tech's modernization would come under Principal William Pabst, who assumed stewardship in 1946 after serving as chair of the Electrical Department. Pabst created new majors and refined older ones, allowing students to select science and engineering preparatory majors including Aeronautical, Architecture, Chemical, Civil, Electrical (later including Electronics and Broadcast), Industrial Design, Mechanical, Structural, and Arts and Sciences. A general College Preparatory curriculum was added later.

Principal Pabst retired in 1964. A railroad club was established by the late Vincent Gorman, a social studies teacher, and students attended fan trips, tours of rail repair facilities and participated in the restoration of steam engine #103 and a historic rail passenger car at the former Empire State Railroad Museum. In August 1965, a ten-year-old boy named Carl Johnson drowned in the swimming pool at Brooklyn Tech while swimming with his day-camp group. The next year, more than 30 graduating Seniors in the school (including many student leaders) complained that Tech's curriculum was old and outdated. Their primary complaint was that the curriculum was geared toward the small minority of students who were not planning on attending college. In 1967 the schools of New York City got to view television in the classrooms for the first time, thanks to the 420-foot WNYE-TV tower atop Brooklyn Tech.

For the school year beginning in the last half of 1970, young women began attending; all three NYC specialized and test-required science high schools were now coeducational.

Incorporation into specialized high school system and later years
In 1972, Brooklyn Tech, Bronx Science, Stuyvesant High School, and High School for Performing Arts become incorporated by the New York State Legislature as specialized high schools of New York City. The act called for a uniform exam to be administered for admission to Brooklyn Tech, Bronx Science, and Stuyvesant. The exam would become known as the Specialized High Schools Admissions Test (SHSAT) and tested students in math and English. With its statewide recognition, the school had to become co-educational. Previous to this, Brooklyn Tech was All Boys, and had a sister school, Bay Ridge High School which was all girls.

In 1973, Tech celebrated its 50th anniversary with a dinner-dance at the Waldorf Astoria. To further commemorate the anniversary, a monument was erected, with a time capsule beneath it, in the north courtyard. The monument has eight panels, each with a unique design representing each of Tech's eight majors at that point.

In 1983, Matt Mandery's appointment as principal made him the first Tech alumnus to hold that position. The following year, Tech received the Excellence in Education award from the U.S. Department of Education. The Alumni Association was formally created during this time, and coalitions were formed with the New York City Department of Transportation. Mandery oversaw the addition of a Bio-Medical major to the curriculum. John Tobin followed as principal in 1987, abolished the Materials Science department, and closed the seventh-floor foundry.

In the mid-1980s, a violent street gang known as the Decepticons were founded at Brooklyn Tech. As well, in 2000, the city issued a special report concerning the lack of notification to law enforcement during a string of robberies within the high school, including armed robbery with knives and stun guns.

Recent years
In March 1998, an alumni group led by Leonard Riggio, class of 1958, announced plans for a fund-raising campaign to raise $10 million to support their alma mater financially through facilities upgrades, the establishment of curriculum enhancements, faculty training, and a university-type endowment. The endowment fundraiser, the first of its kind for an American public school, received front-page attention in The New York Times and sparked a friendly competition amongst the specialized high schools, with both Bronx Science and Stuyvesant announcing their own $10 million campaigns within weeks of the Brooklyn Tech announcement. In November 2005, the Brooklyn Tech Alumni Association announced the completion of the fundraising phase of what they had termed the Campaign for Brooklyn Tech. In April 2008, the Brooklyn Tech Alumni Foundation launched a second endowment campaign.

Sixteen alumni died in the September 11 attacks in 2001. They are Dennis Cross '59, Ronald F. Orsini '60, Joel Miller '63, Sheldon R. Kanter '66, Stephen Johnson '75, Danny Libretti '76, Dominick E. Calia '79, Dipti Patel '81, Andre Fletcher '82, Courtney W. Walcott '82, Gerard Jean Baptiste '83, Wai C. Chung '84, Paul Innella '85, Michael McDonnell '85, Thomas Tong '87, and Paul Ortiz '98.

Since 2001, Brooklyn Tech has undergone such refurbishing as the renovation of the school's William L. Mack Library entrance, located on the fifth-floor center section. As well, two computer labs were added. The school also reinstated a class devoted to the study of Shakespeare, which students can elect to take in their senior year.

Lee McCaskill
Dr. Lee D. McCaskill, the appointed principal in 1992, served for 14 years, during which Tech saw the installation of more computer classrooms and the switch from the traditional mechanical drawing by hand to teaching the use of computer-aided design programs.

In 2000, the Special Commissioner of Investigation for the NYC School District wrote a report condemning Brooklyn Technical High School administrators for failing to report several armed robberies that took place in the bathrooms and stairwells.

In 2003, The New York Times published an investigative article that noted "longstanding tensions" between the faculty and Principal McCaskill, "spilled into the open in October, with news reports that several teachers accused him of repeatedly sending sexually explicit e-mail messages from his school computer to staff members." While the article praised him for his addition of music and sports programs, it mostly described the principal as autocratic, controlling the school "largely through fear and intimidation," and documented acts of personal vindictiveness toward teachers; severe censorship of the student newspaper and of assigned English texts, including the refusal to let the Pulitzer Prize-finalist novel Continental Drift by Russell Banks be used for a class; and of bureaucratic mismanagement. A follow-up column in 2004 found that there was increased teacher exodus, specifically documenting Principal McCaskill's campaign against Alice Alcala, who described as one of the city's leading Shakespeare teachers. Alcala had won Brooklyn Tech a $10,000 grant and brought in the Royal National Theatre of Great Britain for student workshops, but after Alcala had done so, McCaskill repeatedly denied her access to the auditorium and gave her low performance rankings. Shortly after, Alcala left for Manhattan's Murry Bergtraum High School, where she brought in $1,800 in grants for Shakespeare education; meanwhile, at Brooklyn Tech, there was no longer any course solely devoted to Shakespeare, according to the column.

In two newspaper articles in 2005, it was revealed that a $10,000 grant obtained by Dr. Sylvia Weinberger in 2001 to refurbish the obsolete radio studio remained unused. New classroom computers were covered in plastic rather than installed because the classrooms had yet to be wired for them.

The Office of Special Investigations of the New York City Department of Education launched an investigation of McCaskill on February 2, 2006, concerning unpaid enrollment of New Jersey resident McCaskill's daughter in a New York City public school, which is illegal for non-residents of the city. Dr. McCaskill produced a lease claiming that he rented an apartment in Brooklyn, but the copyright date on the lease was after the signatures were dated. On February 6, McCaskill announced his resignation from Brooklyn Tech and agreed to pay $19,441 in restitution.

A week later special commissioner Richard J. Condon rebuked the Department of Education for allowing McCaskill to retire, still collecting $125,282 in accrued vacation time, just days before the OSI completed its investigation. Condon also recommended that Cathy Furman McCaskill, the principal's wife, be dismissed from her position as a teacher at Boys and Girls High School in Brooklyn for her part in submitting fake leases and other fraudulent documents to indicate the family lived in the Cobble Hill section of Brooklyn. The next day, the Department of Education announced that it would fire her. After retiring from Brooklyn Tech, McCaskill became principal of Hillside High School in New Jersey, where in 2013, he resigned following accusations he spanked a female student.

Randy Asher 
On February 7, 2006, the Department of Education named Randy Asher, founding principal of the High School for Math, Science and Engineering (HSMSE), as interim acting principal. Asher had previously served as Brooklyn Tech's assistant principal in mathematics from 2000 to 2002 before leaving to become founding principal of HSMSE. During his time as principal, the total student enrollment increased from 4,200 to 5,700. In the beginning of January 2017, Asher abruptly left Tech to take on a new position as an NYC Education Department senior advisor to help reduce the Absent Teacher Reserve. Throughout Asher's tenure, the school's reputation was sullied by several allegations of sexual harassment and assault of students by faculty members, resulting in the termination of Sean Shaynak (an aerospace engineering teacher hired by Asher) and the reassignment of English teacher and school newspaper advisor David Lo. Music teacher Marisa Cazanave abruptly resigned in the fall of 2016 when faced with charges of having an inappropriate relationship with a male student. The school was also rocked by allegations of racism against black students and Asher faced mounting student pressure on social media to fix the situation. Following Asher's departure, former assistant principal David Newman took on the new position as acting principal of the specialized high school. In February 2020, Newman was appointed principal.

Building and facilities

The school, built on its present site from 1930 to 1933 at a cost of $6 million, is 12 stories high, and covers over half a city block. Brooklyn Technical High School is directly across the street from Fort Greene Park. Facilities at BTHS include:

Gymnasia on the first and eighth floors, with a mezzanine running track above the larger first floor gym and a weight room on the third floor boys locker room. The eighth floor gym had a bowling alley lane and an adjacent wire-mesh enclosed rooftop sometimes used for handball, golf and for tennis practice.
25-yard swimming pool in the basement
Wood, machine, sheet metal and other specialized shops. A program involves a shop where an actual house is built and framed by students. Most have been converted into normal classrooms or computer labs, except for a few robotics shops, such as the Ike Heller Computer Integrated Manufacturing and Robotics Center.
A foundry on the seventh floor, with a floor of molding sand used for creating sand casting molds and equipped with furnaces, kilns, ovens and ancillary equipment for metal smelting. Students made wooden patterns in pattern making, which were used to make sand molds which were cast in the foundry and machined to specification in the machine shops. It was closed in the late 1980s.
Materials testing lab, used during the basic materials science (Strength of Materials) class. Included industrial capacity Universal Testing Machine and brinell hardness tester and polishing and microscopic examination rooms. During the 1960s, students attended "inspection training shop" and were taught to use x-ray analysis to detect metal fatigue failures, use of vernier measuring instruments, micrometers, and go-no-go gauges.
Aeronautical lab, featuring a large wind tunnel, During the 1960s, a T-6 Texan U.S. Air Force surplus aircraft in the building was used for student aeronautical mechanic instruction.
Radio studio and 18,000 watt transmitter licensed by the Federal Communications Commission as WNYE (FM). The studio has not been used since the 1980s.
3,100-seat auditorium, with two balconies — 4th largest auditorium in New York City
Recital hall on the ninth floor
Drafting, both pencil and ink technical drawing and freehand drawing rooms
Library with defunct fireplaces
Football field on Fulton and Clermont Streets. The Football Field, named in honor of Brooklyn Tech Alumnus Charles Wang, was opened in 2001, with the home opener played October 6, 2001, against DeWitt Clinton High School.
Access to Fort Greene Park for outdoor track, tennis, etc.
Mock courtroom for use by the Law & Society major and the Mock Trial Team.
The 420-foot WNYE-FM tower atop the school is three times taller than the building. It was the tallest structure in Brooklyn, beating out AVA DoBro by only one foot, but beaten in 2017 with the completion of The Hub, which is 13 feet taller.
In 1934, the Public Works of Art Project (PWAP), which later became the Works Projects Administration (WPA), commissioned artist Maxwell B. Starr to paint a mural in the foyer depicting the evolution of man and science throughout history.

Transportation
The New York City Subway's Fulton Street and Lafayette Avenue stations are located nearby, as well as more BMT and IRT services at DeKalb Avenue and Atlantic Terminal, which also serves the Long Island Rail Road. Additionally, New York City Bus's  and  routes stop near Brooklyn Tech. Students residing a certain distance from the school are provided full-fare or half-fare student MetroCards for public transportation on their first day of school at BTHS, as well as the first day of each school term onward.

Academics
Brooklyn Tech uses a college-style system of majors, unusual for an American high school. Below is the list of majors at Brooklyn Tech.

Aerospace engineering
Architectural engineering
Biological sciences
Chemical engineering
Civil engineering
Media communications
Electrical engineering
Environmental science research
Finance
Industrial design
Law and society
LIU advanced health professions
LIU PharmD
Applied mathematics
Mechatronics and robotics
Pharmaceutical sciences
Physics
Social science research
Software engineering

Students are placed into a major during the second semester of their sophomore year after ranking all the majors in order of preference. These majors include courses, typically Advanced Placement or Project Lead the Way (PLTW) courses, that concentrate in that specific area of interest given to students during their last two years at Tech. Each major has a different formula (PI index) used to rank students according to their ranking preference of the majors and their current averages from freshman and sophomore year. A student with a higher PI index for their second preference if they did not get into their first, will get priority over another student with a lower average on the same major preference.

Bret Stephens, an opinion columnist, wrote in The New York Times that "The success of Brooklyn Tech only casts an unflattering light on every other corner of the public school bureaucracy."

Extracurricular activities
Brooklyn Tech fields 30 junior-varsity and varsity teams in the Public School Athletic League (PSAL). The school's historic team name has been the Engineers. The school colors are navy blue and white. The school's more than 100 organizations include the Brooklyn Tech Amateur Radio Club (club station call sign W2CXN), Civil Air Patrol Brooklyn Tech Cadet Squadron, chess,  debate, football, wrestling, forensics (speech), hockey, mock trial, robotics, and rowing teams and clubs, and The Survey, the official school newspaper. Tech has a literary art journal, Horizons, for those who want to express themselves through art, poetry, photography, and prose. The Model United Nations provides students with a venue for discussing foreign affairs and also hosts a conference each year called TechMUN. Other clubs cater to a wide range of topics such as anime, the Stock Market, Dance Dance Revolution, ultimate Frisbee, politics, quilting, fashion, debate (which offers Public Forum, Congress and Policy), table tennis and animal rights. The cheerleading squad is named the Enginettes. In 2012, Tech students created a Junior State of America Chapter at their school. Brooklyn Tech has its own student union, to address issues on a student level. Tech has a variety of community service clubs, such as Key Club, Red Cross Club, and BETA. Tech students put on a musical each spring.

There are two step teams, Lady Dragons and Organized C.H.A.O.S.

The school has several Coordinator of Student Activities (COSA).

Notable alumni
A list of notable alumni of Brooklyn Technical High School is listed below. Brooklyn Technical High School also has a unique Hall of Fame, which lists alumni who have contributed significantly to STEM. Such alumni are noted below.

Gary Ackerman '60 – United States Representative, New York (1983–2013)
Warren Adler '45 – novelist
David Antin, '50 - poet, art critic, professor
Henry L. Bachman, President of IEEE in 1987. Vice President of BAE Systems
Karol J. Bobko '54 – NASA astronaut (1999 Hall of Fame inductee)
George R. Caron '38 – Tail gunner aboard the Enola Gay
John Catsimatidis '66 – chairman and CEO, Red Apple Group
Frank A. Cipriani, Ph.D., '51 – President, SUNY at Farmingdale (1998 Hall of Fame inductee)
Harry Chapin '60 – Entertainer, humanitarian (2000 Hall of Fame inductee)
Tom Chapin '62 – Entertainer, humanitarian
Lorenzo Charles '81 – Professional basketball player
Cordell Cleare – New York State Senator
Kim Coles '80 – Actress
Diane Dixon '82 – U.S. Track and Field Olympic gold medalist (1984)
John Piña Craven '42 – Chief Scientist, US Navy Special Projects Office
James E. Dalton '49 – former Chief of Staff, Supreme Headquarters Allied Powers Europe; retired United States Air Force general (1998 Hall of Fame inductee)
Tavonia Evans, African-American author, businesswoman, cryptocurrency expert, and educator
Richard Fariña '55 – Writer, folksinger
Lou Ferrigno '69 – Bodybuilder, actor
Sidney Gordin, artist, professor
Meredith Gourdine, Ph.D., '48 – Electrogasdynamics pioneer, '52 Olympic silver medalist] (1998 Hall of Fame inductee)
Warren Foster '23 – Cartoon music composer
Geoff Fox '68 – WTNH meteorologist
Bernard Friedland '48 – engineer, professor at New Jersey Institute of Technology
Elmer L. Gaden c.'40 – "The father of biochemical engineering"
Carl Gatto '55 – Alaska House of Representatives from 2003 to 2012
Gerry Goffin '57 – Brill Building lyricist
Francis Grasso '67 – Early disco DJ
David Groh '58 – actor, television's Rhoda
Gary Gruber, Ph.D., '58 – Author, physicist, testing expert
Arthur Hauspurg – former Chairman of Consolidated Edison
 Isaac Heller (1926-2015, class of 1943), toy manufacturer who co-founded Remco (2013 Hall of Fame inductee)
Herbert L. Henkel '66 – former Chairman of Ingersoll Rand Corporation
Tommy Holmes '35 – Major League Baseball player
Joseph J. Jacobs, Ph.D., '34 – Author, engineer, humanitarian (2003 Hall of Fame inductee)
Lamont Jones (born 1972) - basketball player
Marvin Kitman '47 – Author, Newsday television critic] (1998 Hall of Fame inductee)
Joseph J. Kohn, '50 – Mathematician (2000 Hall of Fame inductee)
Richard LaMotta '60 – Founder of Chipwich, ice cream sandwich company
Jerry Landauer – investigative journalist with The Wall Street Journal
Ivan Lee '99 – Internationally ranked saber fencer
Al Lerner '51 – Businessman, ran MBNA and former owner of the Cleveland Browns 
MSgt. Meyer S. Levin '34 – Decorated Army Air Force hero, World War II (1999 Hall of Fame inductee)
Harvey Lichtenstein '47 – Executive Director, Brooklyn Academy of Music (1967–99) (1999 Hall of Fame inductee)
Turk Lown, Major League Baseball player
Jack Maple '70 – New York City Deputy Police Commissioner for Crime Control Strategies (1994-1996) and developer of CompStat process; completed high school equivalency after dropping out
Richard Matheson '43 – Author, screenwriter
Barry Mayo '70 – Radio executive
Matthew F. McHugh '56 – U.S. Congressman (1975–93)
Londell McMillan '83 – Attorney
Conrad McRae '89 – Professional basketball player
Saverio "Sonny" Morea '50 – American aerospace engineer, former NASA employee, and flight instructor. He managed the development of the Rocketdyne F-1 and Rocketdyne J-2 for the Apollo program Saturn V rocket, as well as the Lunar Roving Vehicle.
Tony "Anthony" Moran '82 – DJ, remix/record producer
Zellnor Myrie '04 – New York State Senator
Richie Narvaez '82 – Author
Mike Nieves –  Deputy Chief of Staff to New York City Council Speakers Christine Quinn, Gifford Miller and Peter Vallone
Ronnie Nunn '68 – NBA Director of Officials
Arno Allan Penzias, Ph.D. '51 – 1978 Nobel laureate in physics (2000 Hall of Fame inductee)
Frederik Pohl '37 – science fiction author, editor and fan; dropped out due to family exigencies during the Great Depression; received honorary diploma in 2009
Vernon Reid '76 – Musician, Living Colour
Sal Restivo, Ph.D., '58 – Author, researcher] (1998 Hall of Fame inductee)
Leonard Riggio '58 – chairman, Barnes & Noble (1999 Hall of Fame inductee)
Werner Roth '66 – Professional soccer hall-of-famer
Albert Ruddy '48 – Two-time Academy Award-winning producer
Mark Sarvas '82 – Novelist, book critic
Steven Sasson '68 – National Medal of Technology and Innovation-winner for work on digital photography (2013 Hall of Fame inductee)
John P. Schaefer, President Emeritus of the University of Arizona.
Raymond Scott '27 – composer, pianist, engineer
Irwin Shapiro '47 – astrophysicist
Keeth Smart '96 – Men's fencing silver medalist, 2008 Olympics
Erinn Smart '97 – Women's fencing silver medalist, 2008 Olympics
Chris Stanley – Radio producer for the Ron and Fez show
George Wald, Ph.D., '23 – Biologist, '67 Nobel Laureate] (1998 Hall of Fame inductee)
Charles B. Wang '62 – Co-founder, Computer Associates International; minority owner, New York Islanders hockey team (2000 Hall of Fame inductee)
Anthony D. Weiner '81 – United States Representative from New York (1999–2011)
Robert Anton Wilson '50 – countercultural writer, futurist and Playboy associate editor
Jumaane Williams '94 – New York City Public Advocate and former New York City Council member
Walter Yetnikoff '49 – attorney and record industry executive
Paul Yesawich '41 – professional basketball player
Marilyn Zayas '82 – Judge, Ohio's First District Court of Appeals
Lee David Zlotoff '70 – television writer

In popular culture 
The Brooklyn Tech Cheerleading Squad appeared in the 1988 Spike Lee film School Daze, and a video for the movie, entitled "Da Butt", was shot at Brooklyn Tech.

Lee also used the first floor gymnasium as a shooting location for Jesus Shuttlesworth's, played by Ray Allen, Sportscenter preview in He Got Game..

School interiors for the pilot episode of the 2013 series The Tomorrow People were filmed in Brooklyn Tech. (Subsequent episodes were filmed in Vancouver rather than New York City.)

Brooklyn Tech was also used to film the FOX series Gotham.

See also 

 Education in New York City
 List of high schools in New York City

Notes

References

Bibliography

Photographer's tour of school, archived photos and article

External links

The Tech Internet Radio Project
Brooklyn Tech Robotics Team 334: The TechKnights
Brooklyn Tech Alumni Association
InsideSchools.org: H.S. 430 Brooklyn Technical High School

 
1922 establishments in New York City
Educational institutions established in 1922
NCSSS schools
New York City Department of Education
Public high schools in Brooklyn
Specialized high schools in New York City
Fort Greene, Brooklyn